My Leopold (German: Mein Leopold) is a 1919 German silent comedy film directed by Heinrich Bolten-Baeckers and starring Leo Peukert. It is based on the 1873 play My Leopold.

Cast
In alphabetical order
 Leona Bergere as Frau Zernikow  
 Conrad Dreher as August Weigelt, Schuhwarenfabrikant  
 Sabine Impekoven as Klara  
 Fritz Lion as Amtsrichter Zernikow  
 Richard Ludwig as Leopold  
 Annemarie Mörike as Marie  
 Melita Petri as Emma  
 Leo Peukert as Starke, Geschäftsführer  
 Otto Treptow as Mehlmeyer, Komponist

References

Bibliography
 Hans-Michael Bock and Tim Bergfelder. The Concise Cinegraph: An Encyclopedia of German Cinema. Berghahn Books.

External links

1919 films
Films of the Weimar Republic
Films directed by Heinrich Bolten-Baeckers
German silent feature films
German black-and-white films
1919 comedy films
German films based on plays
German comedy films
Silent comedy films
1910s German films
1910s German-language films